The Champion Jockey of National Hunt racing in Ireland is the jockey who has ridden the most winning horses during a season. The list below shows the Champion Jockey for each year since 1947. The current champion, as of 2022, is Paul Townend.

Champion Jockeys since 1946

1946 – Martin Molony
1947 – Martin Molony
1948 – Martin Molony
1949 – Martin Molony
1950 – Martin Molony 
1951 – Martin Molony
1952 – Pat Taaffe
1953 – Pat Taaffe 
1954 – Pat Taaffe
1955 – Pat Taaffe
1956 – Toss Taaffe 
1957 – Toss Taaffe 
1958 – Bobby Beasley
1959 – Bobby Beasley 
1960 – Bobby Beasley
1961 – Pat Taaffe 
1962 – Francis Shortt & Pat Taaffe 
1963 – Bobby Coonan, Tony Redmond, Francis Shortt & Pat Taaffe 
1964 – Pat Taaffe
1965 – B Hannon 
1966 – Pat Taaffe 
1967 – Bobby Coonan
1968 – Bobby Coonan
1969 – Bobby Coonan
1970 – Bobby Coonan 
1971 – Bobby Coonan 
1972 – Bobby Coonan 
1973 – Tommy Carberry  
1974 – Tommy Carberry 
1975 – Frank Berry & Tommy Carberry
1976 – Tommy Carberry 
1977 – Frank Berry 
1978 – Frank Berry
1979 – Joe Byrne
1980 – Frank Berry 
1981 – Frank Berry
1982 – Frank Berry 
1983 – Frank Berry 
1984 – Frank Berry & Tony Mullins 
1985 – Tommy Carmody 
1986 – Frank Berry & Tom Morgan
1987 – Frank Berry 
1988 – Tommy Carmody
1989–90 – Charlie Swan 
1990–91 – Charlie Swan 
1991–92 – Charlie Swan
1992–93 – Charlie Swan
1993–94 – Charlie Swan 
1994–95 – Charlie Swan
1995–96 – Charlie Swan - 147
1996–97 – Charlie Swan 
1997–98 – Charlie Swan 
1998–99 – Ruby Walsh
1999–00 – Barry Geraghty
2000–01 – Ruby Walsh – 84
2001–02 – Paul Carberry – 109
2002–03 – Paul Carberry – 106
2003–04 – Barry Geraghty – 110
2004–05 – Ruby Walsh – 111
2005–06 – Ruby Walsh – 90
2006–07 – Ruby Walsh – 125
2007–08 – Ruby Walsh – 131
2008–09 – Ruby Walsh – 121
2009–10 – Ruby Walsh – 108
2010–11 – Paul Townend – 80
2011–12 – Davy Russell – 104
2012–13 – Davy Russell – 103
2013–14 – Ruby Walsh – 122
2014–15 – Ruby Walsh – 79
2015–16 – Ruby Walsh – 105 
2016–17 – Ruby Walsh – 131
2017–18 – Davy Russell – 119
2018–19 – Paul Townend – 109
2019–20 – Paul Townend – 105
2020–21 – Paul Townend - 100
2021–22 – Paul Townend - 84

Records
Most titles – 12, Ruby Walsh
Most consecutive titles – 9, Charlie Swan
Most wins in a season – 147, Charlie Swan

See also
 British jump racing Champion Jockey
 Irish flat racing Champion Jockey

References

Irish jockeys
Horse racing in Ireland